The men's basketball tournament at the 2004 Summer Olympics in Athens, began on 15 August and ended on 28 August, when Argentina defeated Italy 84–69 for the gold medal. The games were held at the Helliniko Olympic Indoor Arena and Olympic Indoor Hall.

Medalists

Qualification

Format
 Twelve teams are split into two preliminary round groups of six teams each.
 The top four teams from both groups qualify for the knockout stage.
 Fifth-placed teams from both groups compete for ninth place in an additional match.
 Sixth-placed teams from both groups compete for 11th place in an additional match.
 In the quarterfinals, the matchups are as follows: A1 vs. B4, A2 vs. B3, A3 vs. B2 and A4 vs. B1.
 From the eliminated teams at the quarterfinals, the loser from A1 vs. B4 competes against the loser from B1 vs. A4 for seventh place in an additional match. The remaining two loser teams compete for fifth place in an additional match.
 The winning teams from the quarterfinals meet in the semifinals as follows: A1/B4 vs. A3/B2 and A2/B3 vs. A4/B1.
 The winning teams from the semifinals contest the gold medal. The losing teams contest the bronze.

Tie-breaking criteria:
 Head to head results
 Goal average (not the goal difference) between the tied teams
 Goal average of the tied teams for all teams in its group

Squads

Preliminary round

Group A 

All times are local (UTC+3)

Group B

All times are local (UTC+3)

Classification matches
All times are local (UTC+3)

Knockout stage

Quarterfinals
In spite of an undefeated preliminary round, the Spaniards were defeated by The United States to the chagrin of Spanish head coach Mario Pesquera.

Unlike their Spanish counterparts, however, the Lithuanians had an easy time disposing of the Del Harris-led Chinese squad.

Argentina, led by 13 points from both Manu Ginóbili and Fabricio Oberto, disposed of the home squad, led by the 12 points from Nikos Chatzivrettas.

All times are local (UTC+3)

Semifinals
All times are local (UTC+3)

Bronze Medal match
The United States won its first bronze medal since 1988 by avenging the preliminary loss to Lithuania of one week earlier.

All times are local (UTC+3)

Gold Medal match
Argentina won its first ever Olympic gold medal in basketball and became the first Latin and first Hispanic nation to obtain an olympic gold medal in men's basketball.

All times are local (UTC+3)

Statistical leaders
Top ten in points, rebounds and assists, and top 5 in steals and blocks.

Points

Rebounds

Assists

Steals

Blocks

Game highs

Final standings

See also
 Women's Tournament

References

2004 Olympics: Tournament for Men, FIBA Archive. Accessed June 24, 2011.
Official Olympic Report, la84foundation.org. Accessed June 24, 2011.

 
Basketball at the 2004 Summer Olympics
Basketball at the Summer Olympics – Men's tournament